Calliotropis patula is a species of sea snail, a marine gastropod mollusk in the family Eucyclidae.

Description
The size of the shell varies between 20 mm and 28 mm.

Distribution
This species occurs in the Indian Ocean off Madagascar and Mozambique.

References

 Vilvens C. (2007) New records and new species of Calliotropis from Indo-Pacific. Novapex 8 (Hors Série 5): 1–72.

External links
 

patula
Gastropods described in 1904